The third legislative assembly election to the Madras state (presently Tamil Nadu) was held on 21 February 1962. The Indian National Congress party, led by K. Kamaraj, won the election. Dravida Munnetra Kazhagam made significant in-roads in the election and emerged as the second party for the first time by winning 50 seats. 1962 Election remains the most recent election in which Indian National Congress to form a majority Government in the State as its support was heavily declined due to rise of Dravidian political parties.

Constituencies 
Two member constituencies were abolished in 1961 by the Two-Member Constituencies(Abolition) Act, 1961. 38 two member constituencies were abolished and an equal number of single member constituencies were established and reserved for Scheduled Caste and Scheulde Tribe candidates. The total number of constituencies remained at 206.

Background 
Dravida Munnetra Kazhagam was emerging as a major challenger to Indian National Congress party in Tamil Nadu. However, its popularity was limited to the urban areas surrounding Madras and North and South Arcot districts. It had lacked a major support base in rural central and southern Tamil Nadu, a strong base of the Congress party. It won three city elections of the five largest cities, Madras, Madurai, Tiruchirappalli, Salem and Coimbatore in Madras state in alliance with the Communist Party of India in 1959 capitalising on its powerful urban base.

While trying to clarify DMK's position on "Northern domination", Annadurai said his party only meant that the existing Central Government was holding extraordinary powers over the States and his party only seeks to change this by "amendment of the Constitution through Constitutional methods". Infuriated by the softening of DMK's position, E. V. K. Sampath condemned what he called Annadurai's "dictatorship".

Parties and issues 
Indian National Congress contested the election alone. Periyar E. V. Ramasamy supported Congress headed by K. Kamaraj. He said
I am old. I may not live long. After I am gone, Kamaraj will safeguard the interest of the Tamils. He is my heir. Ultimately it is Kamaraj who counts-not others, candidates or even voters who are anyway unfit to judge what is right and good for them! Take my word, vote Congress and you will be well. If you don't, the ingenious Rajaji riding the DMK horse will trample you all without mercy.

Kamaraj fully made use of the popularity of E. V. Ramaswamy and identified himself with Tamil Nationalist aspirations. In February 1962, he introduced a bill Changing the name of Madras to Tamil Nadu for communications within the state and advocated to establish Madurai as the capital city of Madras.

As the 1962 election approached, the two wings of Dravida Munnetra Kazhagam further polarised over the issue of electoral alliance. E. V. K. Sampath favoured alliance with Communist Party of India and Annadurai favoured alliance with the newly formed C. Rajagopalachari's Swatantra Party. Rajaji, the Chief Minister of Madras State between 1952 and 1954 had been a declared enemy of DMK and now he sought alliance with DMK. He said that the Congress party is more communal than parties which are openly communal.
In 1961, Sampath left DMK to form his own party Tamil Nationalist Party with an objective and goal to establish an "autonomous Tamil State". Annadurai's idea to include Swatantra Party in the electoral alliance was not totally welcome in the DMK party and despite Rajaji's opposition DMK aligned with the Communist Party of India. It also formed coalition with Muthuramalinga Thevar's Forward Bloc and Mohammad Ismail's Muslim League.

Support from Tamil film industry 
M. G. Ramachandran actively campaigned for Dravida Munnetra Kazhagam. S. S. Rajendran, one of the popular actors contested and won from Theni Constituency. Shivaji Ganesan extended his support & actively campaigned to Congress Party. Congress party made a movie Vakkurimai by popular film actors which was played all across Tamil Nadu.

Voting and results
Source: Election Commission of India

Results

By constituency

See also 
 Elections in Tamil Nadu
 Legislature of Tamil Nadu
 Government of Tamil Nadu

Footnotes

External links
 Election Commission of India
 Rethinking Dravidian Hegemony in Tamil Nadu Party Politics

State Assembly elections in Tamil Nadu
Madras